"The Ghost who Saved the Bank at Monte Carlo" is the eleventh episode of the 1969 ITC British television series Randall and Hopkirk (Deceased) starring Mike Pratt, Kenneth Cope and Annette Andre. The episode was first broadcast on 30 November 1969 on the ITV. Directed by Jeremy Summers.

Synopsis

Cast
Mike Pratt as Jeff Randall
Kenneth Cope as Marty Hopkirk
Annette Andre as Jeannie Hopkirk
Mary Merrall ....  Clara Faringham
Brian Blessed ....  Jim Lawsey
Veronica Carlson ....  Suzanne
Clive Cazes ....  Claude
Nicolas Chagrin ....  Andre
Nicholas Courtney ....  Max
Roger Croucher ....  Terry
Roger Delgado ....  Tapiro
Hans De Vries ....  Hibert
Eva Enger ....  Young Lady
Michael Forrest ....  Verrier
Richard Pescud ....  Hotel Receptionist
John Sharp ....  Sagran
Colin Vancao ....  French Croupier

Video and DVD release
The episode was released on VHS and several times on DVD with differing special features.

Trivia
During the filming of this episode, Nicholas Courtney (Max) and Roger Delgado (Tapiro) met for the first time; they are best known for their recurring roles in Doctor Who in the early 1970s, playing Brigadier Lethbridge-Stewart and the Master respectively. They appeared in a total of seven serials together from 1971 to 1972, all of which starred Jon Pertwee as the Third Doctor.

External links

Randall and Hopkirk (Deceased) episodes
1969 British television episodes